Paul Emil Jacobs (August 20, 1802 in Gotha – January 6, 1866) was a German painter, noted for Orientalist themes, portraits and nudes.

Life and career

Jacobs, son of the philologist Frederick Jacobs, received his art training at the Munich Academy of Fine Arts and first became known for his painting of Mercury and Argus (from Classical mythology). In 1824 he went to Rome, where he attracted critical attention by painting "The Raising of Lazarus". In 1836 he made a series of historical paintings at the Welfenschloss in Hannover.

Jacobs was noted for his mastery of nudes, expressed particularly in the representation of such Orientalist themes as "A slave market" or of sleeping and waking naked boys.

Graceful depictions of the female body include his "A Harem Beauty At Her Toilette" and "Zither-playing Turk". His image of Scheherezade from Arabian Nights is noted for its light effects. The famous Ali Pasha was depicted by Jacobs in a moment of relaxed intimacy with his favorite mistress (or wife) Kira Vassiliki.

Like many Europeans of his generation, Jacobs shared in the Philhellene sympathy for the Greek War of Independence, which took place when he was in the early stage of his artistic career. This was manifested in his painting very sympathetic pictures of "Greek Freedom Fighters".

Jacobs was also a portrait painter. Lithographed portraits by him include those of Goethe, Karl Gottlieb Bretschneider and Döring.

In 1844, Jacobs created the monumental altarpiece "Calvary", for St. Augustine's Church in Gotha. It was removed from St. Augustine's in 1939, and since 1998 the altarpiece has been located in the church of Hohenleuben.

Jacobs was married to Louise Jahn, and his grandson Emil Jacobs (1868–1940) was a librarian and head of the library at the University of Freiburg.

See also
 List of Orientalist artists
 Orientalism

References

External links
 Jacobs' "Ali Pasha and Kira Vassiliki" auctioned by Sotheby's London on April 17, 2008
 Jacobs paintings including: "The Pasha’s Favourite" (Ali Pasha And Kira Vassiliki);"A Harem Beauty At Her Toilette"; "Archangel Gabriel"; "Archangel Michael With Sword And Scale"; "Praying Roman Lady"; "Mount Calvary"; "Judith And Holofernes", "Ali Pasha" and "Two Greek Freedom Fighters"

1802 births
1866 deaths
19th-century German painters
19th-century German male artists
Academy of Fine Arts, Munich alumni
German male painters
Orientalist painters